The 1951 Italian local elections were the first after the majoritarian regulatory reforms wanted by the government of Alcide De Gasperi. In 1951 there was also the democratic re-establishment of the provincial councils, after the provinces had been administered for six years by temporary deputies appointed by the prefects. However, different from the municipal legislation that had general validity, the new provincial legislation applied only in 79 provinces.

The first turn of elections was held on 27–28 May for 3,071 municipalities and 27 provinces, while the second turn was held on 10–11 June for 2,165 municipalities and 30 provinces.

Municipal elections
Municipalities won in the elections of 27–28 May.

Provincial elections
Overall results in 27 provinces in the elections of 27 and 28 May.

Overall results in 30 provinces in the elections of 10 and 11 June.

References

1951 elections in Italy
 
Municipal elections in Italy